was a stable of sumo wrestlers, one of the Nishonoseki group of stables. Its most recent incarnation dated from 1992 when it was revived by Daijuyama of the Futagoyama stable. The previous version of the stable had been wound up in 1985 when former yokozuna Wajima was forced to leave the Japan Sumo Association. The Mongolian rikishi Kōryū became the revived Hanakago's first sekitori in January 2007 and in July 2008 reached the top makuuchi division. The stable closed after the May 2012 tournament, with its wrestlers moving to Minezaki stable.

Owner
1992-2012: 15th Hanakago (former sekiwake Daijuyama Tadaaki)

Notable members
Kōryū

Referees
Mitsunosuke Kimura (Makoto Kawahara) - jūryō referee
Kazuma Kimura 	(Kazuma Okada) - jonokuchi referee

Ushers
Masao 	(Noriyuki Otaka) - jūryō usher

See also 
Hanakago-oyakata
Hanaregoma stable
List of sumo stables

References

External links 
Hanakago stable page at Japan Sumo Association (English) (Japanese)

Defunct sumo stables